Rafael Hernández may refer to:

Rafael Hernández Colón (1936–2019), 4th Governor of the Commonwealth of Puerto Rico
Rafael Hernández Marín (1892–1965), Puerto Rican composer
Rafael Hernández Airport, an airport named after the Puerto Rican composer in Aguadilla, Puerto Rico
Rafael Tobías Hernández Alvarado (born 1953), known as Toby Hernandez, former Major League Baseball catcher for the Toronto Blue Jays
Rafael Hernández (actor) (1928–1997), Spanish actor
Rafael Hernández Montañez (born 1972), Puerto Rican politician
Rafael Hernández Rojas (born 1946), Mexican Olympic swimmer
Rafael Cedeño Hernández, imprisoned Mexican drug trafficker 
Rafael Batista Hernández (born 1936), Spanish footballer 
Rafael Mas Hernández (1950–2003), Spanish geographer
Rafael Hernandez (Days of Our Lives), fictional soap opera character from Days of Our Lives